Mariusz Błaszczak  (born 19 September 1969, in Legionowo) is a Polish politician, historian, and local government representative. Since 9 January 2018, Blaszczak has been the Minister of National Defence of Poland. 

On 22 June 2022 President Andrzej Duda nominated Błaszczak to succeed Jarosław Kaczyński as the Deputy Prime Minister of Poland.

Biography

Błaszczak took a degree in history at Warsaw University in 1994 and completed his studies at the National School of Public Administration in 2001.

He also completed his postgraduate studies in Local Government and Development (1997) and Management and Administration (2006). Subsequently, he served an internship in Ireland. During his studies, he was a member of and served in an advisory capacity for the Independent Students' Association, the Catholic Academic Youth Association and the Center Alliance Party.

After completing his education he worked for the local government administration. As Deputy Mayor of the Wola District of Warsaw in 2002 - 2004, he was noted for his openness to dialogue. Błaszczak demonstrated unwavering dedication to many projects, including the construction of sport centers by educational institutions.

In 2004, he was chosen Mayor of the Śródmieście District. His principal achievement as Mayor was the facilitation of cooperation and communication between the municipal authorities and the residential communities.

His other accomplishment was the initiation of a project for the revitalization of residential buildings in Śródmieście. On 31 October 2005, he was appointed Director of the Prime Minister's Office by Prime Minister Kazimierz Marcinkiewicz.

He was a Member of the Council of Ministers of Poland in Jarosław Kaczyński's Cabinet.

Mariusz Błaszczak is also a member of the Regional Board of Mazovia and the Law and Justice Party Political Council. He is currently serving as Chairperson of the parliamentary club (parliamentary group) of his party.

Since he effectively dispatched the seditious faction within the Law and Justice Party, headed by Joanna Kluzik-Rostkowska and Elżbieta Jakubiak (a parliamentary association tagged as Polska Jest Najważniejsza - Poland Comes First), Mariusz Błaszczak has come to be regarded as Jarosław Kaczyński's right-hand man and his most loyal and trusted advisor.

In 2017, as Interior Minister of Poland, while speaking to Polish Radio about the European refugee crisis, Błaszczak stated that thanks to Christianity there were leaders like "Charles the Hammer who stopped the Muslim invasion of Europe in VIII century".

See also

 Cabinet of Beata Szydło
 Cabinet of Jarosław Kaczyński

References

External links

Official website (English)

1969 births
Living people
People from Legionowo
University of Warsaw alumni
National School of Public Administration (Poland) alumni
Law and Justice politicians
Ministers of National Defence of Poland
Interior ministers of Poland
Members of the Polish Sejm 2007–2011
Members of the Polish Sejm 2011–2015
Members of the Polish Sejm 2015–2019
Members of the Polish Sejm 2019–2023
Anti-Islam sentiment in Poland